Gary Williams Meets Frank Sinatra is jazz vocalist Gary Williams's fourth album, recorded with Chris Dean and his Orchestra, and released in 2010 in Europe and 2011 in Japan. It is a Frank Sinatra tribute album.

Critical reception 

The album was praised by critics and reviewers.

Roy Oakshot of Radio 2 commented: "These CDs are superb… I can’t recall a vocal production of this quality coming out of a British studio since the days of Matt Monro’s best work. Not only Gary's voice, which is just so on song now, but the orchestrations and the performances of Chris Dean and co – and the wonderful audio engineering – all come together to make a breath-taking listening experience."

Clive Fuller of In Tune said: "Gary is not a Sinatra impersonator he is a song stylist in his own right. A vocalist that can be as comfortable singing up tempo songs, rhythmic numbers, as well as performing slow ballads making him a much sought after talent... This CD goes straight onto my Top 10 of 2010 list!"

Track listing

References

External links 
 Official Gary Williams web site: Garry Williams Meets Frank Sinatra

2010 albums
Gary Williams (singer) albums
Frank Sinatra tribute albums